Drakemyre or Drakemire was once a distinct village on the Rye Water in North Ayrshire, Parish of Dalry, Scotland. The settlement on the B780 road to Kilbirnie has become incorporated as a suburb within the town of Dalry.

History

In the 1870s it was recorded as forming a northern suburb of Dalry with woollen manufactories such as Doggartland Mill and a population of 325.

The cottages of Fordmouth record that a ford on the Rye Water existed until a bridge was built nearby at Bridge End.

The 'Trades Hotel' was a lodging house where itinerant workers could stay for sixpence a night.

The old village of Burnside lies slightly further north and once had the school that served the area.

Doggartland House
Doggartland House at Drakemyre may derive its name from 'Dogger' which is Scots for a course ironstone, much mined in the area as witnessed by waste bings below Ryefield and at Flashwood. An impressive, but now largely redundant cast iron bridge crosses the Rye Water within the grounds of Doggartland House. This bridge has very elaborate cast-iron balustrades and the nearby house has been described as 'Italianate' and the driveway is guarded by two pairs of quirky gatepiers, one tall and the other small, octagonal with panels at the top (See photograph).

Doggartland Farm was the property of the Blair Estate in the 1870s. The name element 'Doggart' is recorded as 'Douat' by Timothy Pont in the early 17th century.

Ryefield House

Ryefield House was described as "almost new" in 1851 and the estate possessed a fine 'U-shaped' stable block with a courtyard to the east of the mansion house as well as a large walled garden to the west. The mansion house is of a classical style, built of ashlar with a Doric porch and in the 1920s a single storey ballroom was added, also used as an art gallery by William Barr Knox. William first married Gladys Burrell, a niece of Sir William Burrell the Scottish shipping merchant and philanthropist, made famous through the Burrell Collection. Edith Dunlop of Strathaven was the second wife of William Barr Knox, he is buried in Largs, however a commemorative plaque is also present at the Knox family memorial in Kilbirne 'Auld Kirk' cemetery where he is recorded as being of 'Redheugh and Ryefield'. His daughter was named Diana.

The mansion house is now divided up into flats and the stable block is a private dwelling. The original entrance drive entering from the west was abandoned when a waggonway was laid along the lane that had provided access, forcing a new entrance to be created that branches off near the back of Doggartland Mill.

The walled garden survives, but without the previous ornate garden and central pond that once lay within. A marriage stone with the date '1786' and the initials 'JK' paired with 'WM' has been incorporated into the inside of one wall of the walled garden, presumably originating from an early dwelling house belonging to the Knox family, such as 'Redheugh' in Kilbirnie, childhood home of William Barr Knox. 'wBk 1924' (William Barr Knox) is carved on a panel above the keystone above the entrance that faces the house. 'DB KK 1931' is carved on a probable fountain spout near the shelter on the western end of the walled garden. A pair of finely carved ornate stone features project from the arches that front the old shelter or summer house. The remains of another summerhouse overlooks the site of the old tennis court as shown on OS maps.

Local Industry

A print works is shown above Doggartland in 1856, ironstone pits and their associated refuse tips were present at Hillend and Ryesholm, and a coal pit was also located at Ryesholm with an extensive network of mineral lines in the area.

Doggartland Mill was a woollen mill that was supplied with water power via the Rye Water and a series of lades and millponds. This mill was disused by 1909. In 1895 a large woollen mill lay on the eastern side of the Rye Water at Ryeside near Fordmouth, this was disused by 1938 and the old Doggartland had become a dye works.

Roche built a chemical works at Ryesholm in 1957 to manufacture Vitamins B1 and B5, and in subsequent expansion also produced a range of chemicals. The factory was enlarged in 1983 to become a major producer of Vitamin C. In 2003 Roche focussed on its healthcare products, and sold its chemical interests, including the Ryeholm works, to the Netherlands-based multinational DSM, which concentrated vitamin C production at Ryeholm and closed its works in the United States. In 2014 DSM disclosed plans to expand its already large vitamin and chemicals manufacturing in China, and there were concerns about the future of the Ryeholm works. DSM also has UK factories at Heanor in Derbyshire and Belfast.

Association with Robert Burns
As stated, the Rye Water had a ford below Ryefield House which has been linked with the song "Comin' Thro' the Rye" collected by Robert Burns:-

Micro-history
Stepping stones once crossed the Rye Water near the cottages at Fordmouth.

References 
Notes

Sources
 Close, Rob and Riches, Anne (2012). Ayrshire and Arran, The Buildings of Scotland. New Haven : Yale University Press. .
 Dalry Local History Group (1985). Dalry Remembered. .
 Dobie, James D. (ed Dobie, J.S.) (1876). Cunninghame, Topographized by Timothy Pont 1604–1608, with continuations and illustrative notices. Glasgow: John Tweed.
 McMichael, George. Notes on the Way Through Ayrshire. Ayr : Hugh Henry.

History of North Ayrshire
Villages in North Ayrshire
Dalry, North Ayrshire